Umdanagar is a neighborhood in Hyderabad in Telangana, India.

Transport
Umdanagar is well-connected by the buses, TSRTC, which ply on two routes covering most of the area, and all the buses stop here. There is a train station for local trains.

The Hyderabad Airport is located about 5 kilometers from it.

References 

Neighbourhoods in Hyderabad, India